Vaughania cloiselii is a species of legume in the family Fabaceae. It is found only in Madagascar.

Sources

Indigofereae
Endemic flora of Madagascar
Vulnerable plants
Taxonomy articles created by Polbot
Taxobox binomials not recognized by IUCN